Washington Story is a 1952 American drama film directed by Robert Pirosh and starring Van Johnson and Patricia Neal. The screenplay concerns a reporter in search of government corruption who falls for a congressman.

Plot
On her first trip to Washington, D.C., aspiring reporter Alice Kingsley is shown around by Gilbert Nunnally, a successful radio commentator. Nunnally has a cynical view of the Capitol and everybody in it, expressing his belief that every politician can be bought.

Alice wants to see if there is any truth to that, so she chooses a young Massachusetts congressman with a squeaky-clean image, Joe Gresham, and introduces herself. Joe is wary of the press and makes a telephone call to check her credentials, but Alice, having anticipated this, gives him a number for Nunnally, who pretends to be the reporter's editor and vouches for her credentials.

Following him around, Alice is impressed by Joe's work ethic and personality. She wonders if veteran politician Charles Birch is a corrupting influence, only to learn that Birch has been a mentor to Joe and is greatly admired.

Nunnally persuades Alice that something is going on between Joe and a lobbyist named Phil Emery, who is trying to get Joe's key vote for a bill to pass. Joe is more concerned about its effect on his own constituents than its greater impact. Alice isn't sure what to make of that, or of Joe's seeming disinterest in an elderly immigrant's possible deportation.

After a late-night meeting, apparently with Emery, colleagues in Congress end up applauding for Joe after he has a change of heart about the bill. Alice is now persuaded by Nunnally that he sold his vote for a price. She is made aware by Birch that the reason for Joe's attitude toward the press is that he has a libel suit pending against Nunnally in two weeks' time. Nunnally confronts the congressman and offers to suppress the story about Joe selling his vote if the lawsuit is dropped. Joe punches him instead.

Alice runs into the immigrant, who tells her how Joe went to great effort making sure he could remain in the country. It was he, not Emery, that the all-night meeting was with, and Alice also learns that Joe had an honest change of heart about the bill, recognizing it was for the greater good. Alice writes a column singing Joe's praises, and they also realize they are in love.

Cast
 Van Johnson as Joe Gresham
 Patricia Neal as Alice Kingsley
 Louis Calhern as Birch
 Philip Ober as Nunnally
 Sidney Blackmer as Emery
 Elizabeth Patterson as Miss Dee
 Emory Parnell as Howard - INS Chief (uncredited)
 Gordon Richards as Butler (uncredited)
 Hugh Beaumont as House Chaplain (uncredited)

Reception

Box office
According to MGM records the movie was not a hit, earning $557,000 in the US and Canada and $127,000 elsewhere, making a loss to the studio of $1,060,000.

References

External links

Washington Story at TCMDB

1952 films
1952 drama films
American drama films
Films directed by Robert Pirosh
Metro-Goldwyn-Mayer films
American black-and-white films
1950s English-language films
1950s American films